Vareslaid may refer to:

 Vareslaid (Käina), an island of Estonia
 Vareslaid (Väinameri), an island of Estonia